There are various churches dedicated to Saint George the Martyr

St. George Coptic Orthodox Church (Philadelphia)
St George the Martyr Holborn
St George the Martyr Southwark
St. George Melkite Catholic Church
St. George Church

See also
St. George Episcopal Church